Moe Z. Win is a Burmese-American mathematician and electrical engineer known for his work in wireless communications. He is currently a professor at the Massachusetts Institute of Technology.

His research encompasses fundamental theories, algorithm design, and network experimentation for a broad range of real-world problems. His current research topics include network localization and navigation, network interference exploitation, and quantum information science. He has served the IEEE Communications Society as an elected Member-at-Large on the Board of Governors, as elected Chair of the Radio Communications Committee, and as an IEEE Distinguished Lecturer. Over the last two decades, he held various editorial posts for IEEE journals and organized numerous international conferences. Recently, he served on the SIAM Diversity Advisory Committee.

His awards and recognitions include the following:
 2004 IEEE Fellow – "For contributions to wideband wireless transmission". 
 2006 co-recipient (with Professor Robert A. Scholtz of USC, who was also his PhD advisor) of IEEE Eric E. Sumner Award for outstanding contributions to communications technology – "For pioneering contributions to ultra-wide band communications science and technology".
 2007 Global Wireless Education Consortium Wireless Educator of the Year Award.
 2011 IEEE Kiyo Tomiyasu Award (IEEE Institution-level Award) – "For contributions to high-speed reliable communications using optical and wireless channels".

References

External links 
 Moe Z. Win – Aero-Astro faculty page at the Massachusetts Institute of Technology.
 Wireless Communication and Network Sciences Laboratory at the Massachusetts Institute of Technology.

Year of birth missing (living people)
Living people
MIT School of Engineering faculty
University of Southern California alumni
Texas A&M University alumni
Scientists at Bell Labs
Fellow Members of the IEEE
Burmese scientists
Burmese emigrants to the United States
American telecommunications engineers
Electrical engineering academics